Jamie Henn is a US climate activist and founder and director of Fossil Free Media, a nonprofit media lab that supports the movement to end fossil fuels. Fossil Free Media is the home of Clean Creatives, a campaign pressuring public relations and advertising companies to quit working with fossil fuel companies. Henn is the co-founder and former Strategic Communications Director of 350.org, the international climate campaign.

See also 
 Greenwashing

References 

Living people
British environmentalists
Climate activists
Year of birth missing (living people)